John Shoop (born August 1, 1969) is an American football coach and former quarterback, who is the current head coach of the Munich Ravens in the European League of Football (ELF). He played college football at Sewanee. He has coached in the National Football League (NFL) and at the collegiate level.

Early life
Growing up in Oakmont, Pennsylvania, Shoop played quarterback in high school, and continued his football career at Sewanee: The University of the South. Shoop was a member of the Tigers football team from 1987 to 1990, starting from 1988 to 1990. As a senior captain in 1990, Shoop lead the Tigers to a Collegiate Athletic Conference title.

Coaching career

Early career
Shoop began his coaching career as a volunteer quarterbacks coach at Dartmouth College in 1991. He served as a graduate assistant at Vanderbilt University from 1992 to 1994, where he earned a Master of Education degree from Vanderbilt's Peabody School of Education.

Carolina Panthers
Shoop spent four seasons with the Carolina Panthers, where he began his NFL coaching career at the age of 25. Shoop was an offensive quality control assistant for the Panthers from 1995 to 1996. He served as quarterbacks coach for Carolina from 1997 to 1998.

Chicago Bears
Shoop worked five seasons (1999–2003) for the Chicago Bears under head coach Dick Jauron. He served as the quarterbacks coach in 1999 and 2000. He was named offensive coordinator for the last four games of the 2000 season following incumbent Gary Crowton's departure for the head coaching position at Brigham Young University.  Shoop then spent the next three seasons as the offensive coordinator (2001–2003).

James "Big Cat" Williams, the Bears Pro Bowl offensive lineman, nicknamed the offense "The Run and Shoop" during Shoop's tenure as offensive coordinator.

Tampa Bay Buccaneers
Shoop was quarterbacks coach for the Tampa Bay Buccaneers in 2004 under head coach Jon Gruden.

Oakland Raiders
Shoop then coached for the Oakland Raiders where he served as quarterbacks coach in 2005, the tight ends coach in 2006, and as offensive coordinator for the final five games of the 2006 season.

North Carolina
In January 2007, Shoop left the Raiders to become the offensive coordinator of the North Carolina Tar Heels football team.

Purdue
On January 24, 2013, Purdue University head football coach, Darrell Hazell hired Shoop to be the offensive coordinator and quarterbacks coach for the Boilermakers football team after taking a year off from coaching. Purdue's offense struggled in 2013 as Purdue was shut out in back-to-back games for the first time in 60 years and averaged less than 70 yards rushing and 285 yards of total offense per game over the course of the season. After two more seasons of similar struggles, Shoop was fired after the 2015 season.

Statistics
Team offensive statistics where Shoop was offensive coordinator.

Personal life
Shoop is an advocate for players' rights in college athletics. His dismissal from Purdue and his subsequent absence from coaching in college football have also been attributed to conflicts with athletic department administrators over player eligibility, concussion education and his support of a player unionization attempt at Northwestern and name, image and likeness (NIL) rights.

He has lived with his wife Marcia Mount Shoop on a farm in Asheville, North Carolina after leaving Purdue. Since the start of the COVID-19 pandemic, he made a complete recovery from prostate cancer but was later diagnosed with Langerhans cell histiocytosis.

His older brother Bob Shoop has been the defensive coordinator/safeties coach at the University of South Florida since December 6, 2021.

References

1969 births
Living people
American football quarterbacks
Carolina Panthers coaches
Chicago Bears coaches
Dartmouth Big Green football coaches
National Football League offensive coordinators
North Carolina Tar Heels football coaches
Oakland Raiders coaches
Purdue Boilermakers football coaches
Sewanee Tigers football players
Tampa Bay Buccaneers coaches
Vanderbilt Commodores football coaches
European League of Football coaches
Sportspeople from Pittsburgh
Players of American football from Pittsburgh